The 2023 French pension reform bill is a bill in France which aims to raise the retirement age from 62 to 64. Its provisions, which sparked the 2023 French pension reform strikes, were highly controversial, as was the decision of Prime Minister Elisabeth Borne to invoke Article 49.3 of the French Constitution (which essentially allows a draft law to pass without a vote unless the Assembly adopts a motion of no confidence within a set time) on the bill. Two such motions were filed within the required timeframe, and both of them was held on 20 March.

History 
On 30 January the bill was introduced to the National Assembly. 

In February the Assembly started debating the measure. On 14 February, Article 2 of the draft law was rejected by the Assembly with 203 votes to 256.

On 17 February Borne invoked Article 47-1 of the Constitution. Said Article states that if the National Assembly hasn't considered all provisions of a social security financing bill within 20 days of it being introduced, said bill can be trasmitted to and considered by the Senate notwithstanding the fact the Assembly has not yet voted for it in its entirety; it furthermore dictates that after the Senate passes the bill, the latter must be considered by a Joint Committee, which can amend it. The text adopted by the Committee is then put up to a vote in both houses of Parliament, which at that point can only vote in favor or against the whole bill, without being able to further amend it. 

Article 47-1 was employed in order to circumvert the effort of opposition Deputies, which had introduced thousands of amendments in an attempt to obstruct it. 

On 11 March, the Senate passed the bill in a 195-112 vote, with The Republicans and En Marche voting in favour.

On 15 March, a Joint Committee considered the bill, ultimately approving it with some amendments in a 10-4 vote. 

On 16 March, the Senate voted 193-114 to accept the amendments proposed by the Committee. Later the same day the Government, fearing the proposed law wouldn't get enough support to pass in the National Assembly, invoked Article 49 of the Constitution, engaging its responsibility on the bill. This special procedure allows the bill to automatically pass without a vote unless a motion of no confidence is tabled  within 24 hours, in which case the bill is only adopted after said motion is defeated. Two such motions were consequently filed by opposition groups within the required timeframe. Both of them were voted down on 20 March, allowing the bill to pass. It's expected the draft law will be soon signed by President Emmanuel Macron, coming into force.

References 

Pension reform bill
Pensions in France
Emmanuel Macron
Reform in France
Pension reform bill